The Vogtland Arena is a ski jumping venue in Klingenthal, Germany. It features some of the most modern architecture among World Cup hills.

History
Vogtland Arena was constructed from 2003 to 2005. Its official inaugural event was a Nordic combined Summer Grand Prix competition on 27 August 2006. Before that, in February 2006, the Czech national ski jumping championships had already been held there. In March 2006, Vogtland Arena saw a second-tier Nordic combined world cup competition and in September 2006 a Summer Grand Prix in ski jumping. On 7 February 2007, local club VSC Klingenthal took over one of the cancelled Ski Jumping World Cup events of Harrachov, making this the first FIS winter competition at the arena. Once again in 2007, a Summer Grand Prix ski jumping event took place there. In January 2008, the arena saw its first Nordic Combined World Cup event.

Since the 2008-09 season, Klingenthal has been a regular venue of the Ski Jumping World Cup, forming a part of the FIS Team Tour.

External links

 Official Website

Ski jumping venues in Germany
Buildings and structures in Vogtlandkreis
Sports venues in Saxony
Klingenthal
2006 establishments in Germany
Sports venues completed in 2006